Ondeihaluka is a small village in Ohangwena Region outside of Ondangwa. It is the home of the Mwadinomho Combined School.

References

Villages in Namibia
Populated places in the Ohangwena Region